The Jinguashi Mine is one of the largest gold mines in Taiwan and in the world. The mine is located in the north of the country in Ruifang District. The mine has estimated reserves of 8 million oz of gold.

See also
 Jinguashi
 Gold Museum (Taiwan)

References

Gold mines in Taiwan